The Gatesclarkeanini are a tribe of tortrix moths.

Genera
Asymmetrarcha
Atsusina
Gatesclarkeana
Hiroshiinoueana
Ukamenia

References

  2005: World Catalogue of Insects, volume 5: Tortricidae
  2006. Olethreutinae moths of Australia
 , 2012: New olethreutine moths from Japan (Lepidoptera: Tortricidae: Olethreutinae). Tinea 22 (1): 12-24.

 

Moth tribes